The 2021–22 Stanford Cardinal men's basketball team represented Stanford University during the 2021–22 NCAA Division I men's basketball season. The Cardinal were led by sixth year head coach Jerod Haase and competed as a member of the Pac-12 Conference. They played their home games at Maples Pavilion.

Previous season
The Cardinal finished the 2020–21 season 14–13 and 10–10 in Pac-12 play to finish in a tie for seventh place. They lost in the first round of the Pac-12 tournament to California.

Offseason

Departures

2021 recruiting class

2022 Recruiting class

Roster

Schedule and results
Source:

|-
!colspan=12 style=| Regular season

|-
!colspan=12 style=| Pac-12 tournament

References

Stanford Cardinal men's basketball seasons
Stanford
Stanford
Stanford